Michèle McQuigg (September 2, 1947 – February 15, 2017) was a Virginia politician who was a Republican member of the Virginia House of Delegates from 1998 to 2008 before opting not to run for reelection.

Biography
She was elected  Prince William County Clerk of Circuit Court on November 6, 2007.

In her capacity as Prince William County Clerk, McQuigg was one of two defendant-appellants in Bostic v. Rainey.

McQuigg died on February 16, 2017, aged 69 at her home in Woodbridge, Virginia.

References

External links 
 Biography for the Virginia House of Delegates
 

1947 births
2017 deaths
Republican Party members of the Virginia House of Delegates
Women state legislators in Virginia
Virginia Tech alumni
University of Mary Washington alumni
People from Woodbridge, Virginia
People from Bay Shore, New York
County clerks in Virginia
20th-century American politicians
20th-century American women politicians
21st-century American politicians
21st-century American women politicians